Pete Chapman ( – January 13, 2003) was an American football coach and college athletics administrator. He served as the head football coach at Yankton College in Yankton, South Dakota from 1981 and 1982 and Wayne State College in Wayne, Nebraska from 1983 to 1988, compiling a career college football coaching record of 28–54–1. Chapman was the athletic director at Wayne State from 1987 to 1999 and Missouri Western State University from 1999 to 2003.

Chapman died of cancer on January 13, 2003.

Legacy
Wayne State inducted Chapman into its athletic hall of fame in 2002 and renamed its baseball and softball fields the "Pete Chapman Baseball and Softball Complex" in 2006. Following Chapman's death in 2003, Wayne State established the "Pete Chapman Memorial Scholarship" for student-athletes.

Head coaching record

References

1949 births
2003 deaths
Missouri Western Griffons athletic directors
South Dakota State Jackrabbits football coaches
Wayne State Wildcats athletic directors
Wayne State Wildcats football coaches
Yankton Greyhounds football coaches
High school football coaches in Nebraska
Deaths from cancer in Iowa